PlayStation Video (formerly known as Video Unlimited) was an online film and television programme distribution service that first was offered by Sony Entertainment Network in February 2010.

On behalf of studios such as Sony Pictures, 20th Century Studios, Warner Bros. Pictures, Universal Pictures, Metro-Goldwyn-Mayer Pictures, Paramount Pictures, and Lionsgate, Video Unlimited distributed television episodes and new release films as well as a variety of older movies. In November 2010, Video Unlimited began distributing online content in the United Kingdom, France, Germany, Italy, and Spain and has since expanded into Japan, Canada, and Australia. Their redistribution content can be accessed through personal computers and other devices such as Sony Blu-ray players, PlayStation consoles, Xperia smartphones and Sony tablets, Bravia televisions and some portable music players.

On March 2, 2021, Sony announced that it would discontinue offering new purchases and rentals of movies and TV shows through PlayStation Video on August 31.

See also
 PlayStation Vue

References

Video
Defunct video on demand services
Subscription video on demand services
Computer-related introductions in 2010